The Nipissing Lakers are the athletic teams that represent Nipissing University in North Bay, Ontario, Canada that compete in U Sports.

The Lakers varsity programs compete in men's and women's basketball, ice hockey, volleyball, soccer, cross country running, rowing, and nordic skiing. There is also a cross country ski team that occasionally obtains varsity status depending on team size.

The Lakers also have a university ringette team but it is not yet a part of the Ontario University Athletics program.

705 Challenge Cup
First established as a challenge between the varsity soccer teams of two Northern Ontario universities (Laurentian vs. Nipissing), in which the winning team was awarded the Riley Gallo Cup, the rivalry expanded. Introducing the 705 Challenge Cup in 2016, the results of all regular season games between the Lakers and the Voyageurs varsity teams for men's and women's basketball, ice hockey and soccer, comprised the overall won-loss record in determining the annual Cup winner. The Lakers would win their first 705 Challenge Cup during the 2019-20 athletics season.

Men's Basketball
The Lakers men's basketball team debuted in U Sports and OUA play in the 2014–15 season. The Lakers made their first and lone playoff appearance in the 2016–2017 season, making it to the quarterfinals of the OUA playoffs, when they were eventually eliminated by the Ryerson Rams. The head coach of the team is Thomas Cory, who was hired to replace Chris Cheng in June 2020. The Lakers play their home games at the Robert J. Surtees Athletic Centre on the campus of Nipissing University.

Ice Hockey

Ringette

The Lakers university ringette team competes annually in the University Challenge Cup, an annual national competition reserved exclusively for Canadian university and college ringette teams. University ringette is organized by Canadian University & College Ringette Association, commonly known by the abbreviation, "CUR" due to the organization's original name, "Canadian University Ringette". The sport of ringette was invented in North Bay, Ontario (specifically West Ferris) and Espanola, Ontario in 1963.

See also
Ontario University Athletics
U Sports

References

External links 

Lakers
U Sports teams
Sport in North Bay, Ontario